Enticement is a 1925 American silent drama film directed by George Archainbaud and starring Mary Astor, Clive Brook, and Ian Keith.

Plot
As described in a review in a film magazine, Leonore Bewlay (Astor), recently grown into womanhood, while in Switzerland meets a childhood friend, Richard Valyran (Keith), who has become an opera singer. When she is injured, she is shocked into a bewilderment of panic and flees when, as he undresses her to assist, he also kisses her. She marries Henry Wallis (Brook), a devout Englishman, but is disliked by his relatives. Val's wife names Leonore as a correspondent in her divorce suit and Henry loses faith in her. She goes to Val, who still loves her, but he refuses her when he learns that she still loves Henry. In order to free her from any notoriety, Val kills himself. Henry, awed by this sacrifice, takes Leonore back and they find happiness together.

Cast

Preservation
With no prints of Enticement located in any film archives, it is a lost film.

References

Bibliography
 Goble, Alan. The Complete Index to Literary Sources in Film. Walter de Gruyter, 1999.

External links

Stills at famousfix.com

1925 films
1925 drama films
Silent American drama films
Lost American films
Films directed by George Archainbaud
American silent feature films
1920s English-language films
First National Pictures films
American black-and-white films
1925 lost films
Lost drama films
1920s American films